The 2013 Energiewacht Tour is the third edition of the Energiewacht Tour women's cycling stage race. It is rated by the UCI as category 2.2, and is held between 3 and 7 April 2013 in the Netherlands. Twenty-four teams of 6 riders take part.
There is also an Energiewacht Tour for junior riders from 5 to 7 April 2013.

Teams
24 teams of maximal 6 riders take part.
UCI teams

Orica–AIS
Hitec Products–UCK
Boels–Dolmans Cycling Team
MCipollini–Giordana
Lotto–Belisol Ladies
Team Argos–Shimano

Sengers Ladies Cycling Team

National teams

National Team Belgium
National Team Germany
National Team USA
National Team Switzerland

Other teams

Parkhotel Valkenburg Cycling Team
Team Futurumshop.nl
Team CTC
Bigla Cycling Team
Bike4Air NWV Groningen
Rabo Plieger van Arckel
Water, Land en Dijken
Restore Cycling Mix
Ronald Mc Donald huis Groningen

Stages

Stage 1
3 April 2013 – Winschoten (Oldambt) to Winschoten, 
The race consisted of three laps around Bad Nieuweschans and 3 laps around Winschoten. The mayor of Oldambt, Pieter Smit, started the race. The race included two bonification sprints. Lisa Brennauer won the first one, ahead of Ellen van Dijk and Adrie Visser. Visser won the second one ahead of Trixi Worrack and Annemiek van Vleuten. In Bad Nieuweschans the bunch split into three groups. The first group had a 1' 25" seconds gap on the second group before they were sent into the wrong direction. The race was neutralized and the first group got the 1' 25" seconds lead. After that some roads were not properly closed anymore and cars rode over the course. Due to the dangerous situation the women's stopped riding. After a while they continuead riding but later on they had to wait for an open bridge. A protest of the women's followed and with one lap to go the ladies stopped at the start/finish in Winschoten. Some of them wanted to abandon the race but after intense discussions with the organisation the ladies started again with the original time differences between the groups. In the final lap the front group split with a small group of 4 leaders in the front. Kirsten Wild won the side by side sprint of Ellen van Dijk. Iris Slappendel finished in third place.

s.t. = same time

Stage 2
4 April 2013 – Pekela to Veendam, 
Pekela was the start and Veendam the finish place of the team time trial in the 2012 Energiewacht Tour. Now the riders rode the same course in a regular race. After three laps in Pekela the riders rode to Veendam for four local laps there.
During the local laps in Pekela the peloton split in different groups, with a front group of 13 riders. Annemiek van Vleuten got punctured and could not reach the front group during the race. From the stage 1 top-10 of also Christine Majerus was not in the first group. In the final kilometers there were a lot of attacks, but were pulled back. Kirsten Wild pulled back the last one of Lisa Brennauer and won the sprint ahead of Chloe Hosking and Adrie Visser.

s.t. = same time

Stage 3a
5 April 2013 – Winsum to Winsum (individual time trial), 
Winsum will be also the host city for 2013 Dutch National Time Trial Championships and the course of both time trials is probably the same. 
Ellen van Dijk won the time trial with nearly a minute ahead of Lisa Brennauer and Shara Gillow who finished second and third. Van Dijk took over the lead in the general classification from Kirsten Wild who finished 9th at 1' 54".

Source:

Stage 3b
5 April 2013 – Appingedam to Appingedam, 

s.t. = same time
Source:

Stage 4
6 April 2013 – Eemsmond to Uithuizen, 

s.t. = same time
Source:

Stage 5
7 April 2013 – Groningen to Groningen, 

Source:

Final classifications

General classification

Points classification

Sprints classification

Best club rider classification

Youth classification

Team classification

Classification leadership

Junior's Energiewacht Tour classification leadership

References

External links

Engergiewacht Tour
Engergiewacht Tour
Healthy Ageing Tour